Suppressed Duck is a 1965 Warner Bros. Looney Tunes theatrical cartoon directed by Robert McKimson and written by David Detiege. The short was released on June 18, 1965, and stars Daffy Duck. It is Daffy's only solo cartoon in the DePatie–Freleng series.

This marks the final time Daffy appears solo, as well as the final time he says his catchphrase: "You're despicable."

Plot
While on a hunting trip, Daffy Duck hopes to shoot a bear. An announcement from a nearby ranger station informs him of a boundary line drawn through the "hunting area." Hunters are told to remain on one side of the boundary and bears to remain on the other side, unless they want to get shot. Daffy chases several bears to the boundary line, and a ranger keeps him from pursuing them across it. One bear taunts Daffy from his side of the line.

In order to catch this bear, Daffy devises many schemes, including using bacon to entice the bear across the boundary line, erasing the boundary line, and disguising himself as a tree. Each time, the bear outsmarts him or he is caught and reprimanded by the park ranger. In a move reminiscent of the contemporary Pink Panther animated short, "Pink Panzer", the local forestry-officials go to absurdly-extreme lengths to enforce the boundary line, as well, using various heavy weaponry like tanks and bombs to thwart Daffy's efforts to illegally cross the line to hunt the bear.

In his last attempt to catch the bear, Daffy digs a tunnel underneath the boundary line. The bear discovers his plot, traces his way to the spot where Daffy would come out, and places a small cabin of dynamite above him before hiding. Daffy digs up into the cabin, causing the dynamite to explode, leaving him mostly featherless (except for his head). He gathers up his feathers, saying he is lucky that he keeps his feathers "numbered for just such an occasion."

While re-attaching his feathers, he soon discovers that the bottom half of his feathers are missing, and he turns to see the bear wearing them as a headdress and necklace. Before he can retrieve his feathers, the ranger, having enough of Daffy's rule-breaking behavior, decides to close hunting season for the year and demands that he get out. Obviously irked, Daffy (wearing a barrel over his naked bottom half) tells the bear: "You're desthpicable. But, you haven't seen the last of me!!" As he turns to leave, the backend of the barrel falls away, revealing his plucked behind.

See also
 List of American films of 1965
 List of cartoons featuring Daffy Duck

Notes
Daffy drives a jeep, but he doesn't have a driver's license.

Crew
 Director: Robert McKimson 
 Story: David Detiege
 Animation: Bob Matz, Manny Perez, Warren Batchelder, Cliff Nordberg
 Layout: Dick Ung
 Backgrounds: Ron Dias
 Film Editor: Lee Gunther
 Voice Characterizations: Mel Blanc
 Music: Bill Lava
 Produced by: David H. DePatie and Friz Freleng

Home media
Suppressed Duck is available on the Looney Tunes Superstars DVD. However, it was cropped to widescreen.

References

1965 films
Looney Tunes shorts
Warner Bros. Cartoons animated short films
Films directed by Robert McKimson
Daffy Duck films
DePatie–Freleng Enterprises short films
1965 animated films
1965 short films
Animated films about bears
Films scored by William Lava
1960s Warner Bros. animated short films
1960s English-language films